Out of the Blue is a studio album by Dutch DJ and record producer Ferry Corsten, then known by his moniker System F. It was released in 2001 by Tsunami.

Track listing

External links 
Out of the Blue at Discogs

2001 debut albums
Ferry Corsten albums